Keewaydin State Park is a  state park in the Town of Alexandria in  Jefferson County, New York in the United States. The park is located along the St. Lawrence River, southwest of the Village of Alexandria Bay on New York State Route 12.

Open year-round, the park offers a swimming pool and showers, picnic tables, a playground, a campground with 48 campsites, fishing and ice fishing, cross-country skiing, and a boat launch.

See also
 List of New York state parks

References

External links
 New York State Parks: Keewaydin State Park

State parks of New York (state)
Parks in Jefferson County, New York
Protected areas established in 1962
1962 establishments in New York (state)